Ciccioli are pressed cakes of fatty pork. They are known under this name in Emilia Romagna, being popular in Modena, Reggio Emilia, Bologna, Parma, Piacenza, and Romagna. In Naples they are called cicoli. In Lazio and Umbria they are called sfrizzoli. In Calabria they are called risimugli.

Ciccioli are made by compressing, drying, and aging fatty, leftover pieces of pork. These scraps are compressed using a special press where the meat is wrapped in sack cloth, then slowly squeezed over several weeks to remove excess liquid. They can either be prepared in a wet preparation that can be sliced and served, or in a very dry, crunchy, chip-like form often called ciccioli frolli. They result also as leftovers from the preparation of Strutto.

See also 
 Čvarci
 Fatback
 List of pork dishes

References

External links 
 Everything2 Article
 Italian web page about ciccioli with photographs
 Italian article on ciccioli frolli

Pork
Salumi
Italian cuisine